Walter Taylor was an American Negro league pitcher in the 1900s.

Taylor played for the Leland Giants in 1905 and 1908. In 1909, he split time between the Kansas City Giants and the Buxton Wonders.

References

External links
Baseball statistics and player information from Baseball-Reference Black Baseball Stats and Seamheads

Year of birth missing
Year of death missing
Place of birth missing
Place of death missing
Buxton Wonders players
Kansas City Giants players
Leland Giants players
Baseball pitchers